Milton João de Medeiros, known as Canhotinho, (15 July 1924 – 28 July 2008) was a Brazilian footballer. He played in three matches for the Brazil national football team from 1948 to 1949. He was also part of Brazil's squad for the 1949 South American Championship.

References

External links
 
 
 

1924 births
2008 deaths
Brazilian footballers
Brazil international footballers
Footballers from São Paulo
Association football forwards
Sociedade Esportiva Palmeiras players
Racing Club de France Football players
Brazilian expatriate footballers
Expatriate footballers in France